Goli–Mahagi–Bunia Road, is a road in Uganda and the Democratic Republic of the Congo, connecting the towns of Goli in Uganda with Mahagi, Djugu, Nizi and Bunia in DRCongo.

Location
The northern end of this road is in Goli, Uganda at the international border with DRCongo.

Overview
Tis road is one of three roads that have been identified by the governments of Uganda and DR Congo, as of significant importance in facilitating trade, human interaction, regional integration, and enhancement of security along their common border. The three roads are: 1. Goli–Mahagi–Bunia Road 2. Kasindi–Beni–Butembo Road and 3. Bunagana–Rutshuru–Goma Road.

The road is expected to boost Uganda's trade with DRC, in agricultural and manufactured products, including refined petroleum products, as Uganda enters the oil-production phase. Uganda sells cement, sugar, electricity, steel, cereals and beverages to DRC. DRC, in exchange sells timber, kitenge, palm oil, cosmetics and gold to Uganda.

Upgrades and reconstruction
Before 2019, the road was gravel surfaced, in various stages of disrepair. In November 2019, Yoweri Museveni of Uganda and Félix Tshisekedi of the Democratic Republic of the Congo signed agreements in Entebbe, Uganda, to upgrade this road to bituminous surface, within twenty-four months, after the relevant ministers have agreed on implementation details.

See also
 List of roads in the Democratic Republic of the Congo
 List of roads in Uganda

References

External links
 Uganda and DR Congo to build cross-border roads As of 11 November 2019.
 DR Congo, Uganda to jointly build 1,200 km connecting roads As of 11 November 2019.

Roads in the Democratic Republic of the Congo
Roads in Uganda
Geography of the Democratic Republic of the Congo
Transport in the Democratic Republic of the Congo
Transport in Uganda
East African Community
Geography of Uganda